Jateí is a municipality located in the Brazilian state of Mato Grosso do Sul. Its population was 4,021 (2020) and its area is 1,928 km².

The municipality contains 57% of the  Rio Ivinhema State Park, created in 1998.

Famous People
Mert Nobre professional footballer

References

Municipalities in Mato Grosso do Sul